Qionglin Township is a rural township in central Hsinchu County, Taiwan. Its population was estimated at 20,226 in February 2023.

Administrative divisions
The township comprises 12 villages: Hualong, Qionglin, Shangshan, Shitan, Shuikeng, Wenlin, Wulong, Xiashan, Xinfeng, Xiuhu, Yongxing and Zhongkeng.

Education
Ta Hwa University of Science and Technology is a private university located in Shuikeng Village. It is also the largest educational institution in Qionglin. It was founded in 1967, and was originally called Dahua Agricultural College focusing around farming. In 1969, it became an industrial college. In 1991, it was changed to a business school. In 1997, it became a technical college. Finally, in 2012 it took on its current name. The school has 3 schools of engineering, electricity, business and tourism management. It also has 13 departments and 1 research institute. Plus 5 schools of Hakka culture, glass creativity, innovation cultivation, green energy industry, disaster prevention research center, and 3 education centers of general education, sports, and language. In 2003, the school had a total of 331 faculty members and 8,731 students.

Economy 
Qionglin's economy is primarily focused around agriculture. The main crop used is rice, alongside fruits like citrus and pears, and other vegetables like tomatoes.

Tourist attractions
 Deng Yu-Xian Music Memorial Park
 Mount Feifeng
 Rueylong Museum
 Wen-Lin Temple

References

External links

  

Townships in Hsinchu County